The 2020 Dow Tennis Classic was a professional tennis tournament played on indoor hard courts. It was the twenty-sixth edition of the tournament which was part of the 2020 ITF Women's World Tennis Tour. It took place in Midland, Michigan, United States between 3 and 9 February 2020.

Singles main-draw entrants

Seeds

 1 Rankings are as of 20 January 2020.

Other entrants
The following players received wildcards into the singles main draw:
  Elizabeth Coleman
  Kayla Day
  Irina Falconi
  Quinn Gleason

The following players received entry from the qualifying draw:
  Maria Mateas
  Alycia Parks
  Marine Partaud
  Maria Sanchez
  Sofia Shapatava
  Gabriela Talabă
  Katie Volynets
  Xu Shilin

Champions

Singles

 Shelby Rogers def.  Anhelina Kalinina, walkover

Doubles

 Caroline Dolehide /  Maria Sanchez def.  Valeria Savinykh /  Yanina Wickmayer, 6–3, 6–4

References

External links
 2020 Dow Tennis Classic at ITFtennis.com
 Official website

2020 ITF Women's World Tennis Tour
2020 in American tennis
February 2020 sports events in the United States